Chionodes hostis is a moth in the family Gelechiidae. It is found in North America, where it has been recorded from Utah, Arizona and New Mexico.

The larvae feed on Quercus gambelii and Quercus turbinella.

References

Chionodes
Moths described in 1999
Moths of North America